Poophilus costalis is a species of true bug in the family Aphrophoridae. It is a pest of millets in West Africa.

References

Aphrophoridae
Insect pests of millets